Colleen Dion-Scotti (also credited as Colleen Dion) is an American actress. She is best known for her portrayal of Felicia Forrester on the CBS soap opera The Bold and the Beautiful, a role she played from 1990 to 1992, in 1997, and from July to December 2004.

Filmography

References

External links

1964 births
Living people
American soap opera actresses
Actresses from New York (state)
21st-century American women